In the representation theory of semisimple Lie algebras, Category O (or category ) is a category whose objects are certain representations of a semisimple Lie algebra and morphisms are homomorphisms of representations.

Introduction 
Assume that  is a (usually complex) semisimple Lie algebra with a Cartan subalgebra
Denote by 
the root space corresponding to a root  and  a nilpotent subalgebra.

Definition of category O 
The objects of category  are -modules  such that
  is finitely generated
 
  is locally -finite.

Morphisms of this category are the -homomorphisms of these modules.

Basic properties 

Each module in a category O has finite-dimensional weight spaces.
Each module in category O is a Noetherian module.
O is an abelian category
O has enough projectives and injectives.
O is closed under taking submodules, quotients and finite direct sums.

Examples 

 All finite-dimensional -modules and their -homomorphisms are in category O.
 Verma modules and generalized Verma modules and their -homomorphisms are in category O.

See also 
Highest-weight module
Universal enveloping algebra
Highest-weight category

References 

Representation theory of Lie algebras